Manhunt of Mystery Island (1945) is a Republic Movie serial in the science fiction genre.  It was the thirty-sixth serial produced by Republic (of a total of sixty-six) and the first released in 1945.

It is the penultimate 15-chapter serial to be released by the studio. The year 1945, the end of the Golden Age of Serials, was the last in which Republic released any 15-chapter serials, the remainder being either 12 or 13 chapters in length.

In 1966 footage from the serial was edited together into the 100-minute film Captain Mephisto and the Transformation Machine.

Three of the serial's cliffhanger gags / set pieces are copied in Indiana Jones and the Temple of Doom.

Plot
A breakthrough scientific device will revolutionize the world's energy usage if the kidnapped creator can be found. To rescue her father, Claire Forrest enlists the help of private detective, Lance Reardon. Clues lead them to a remote Pacific isle known only as Mystery Island, where the two confront sinister and astonishing forces. The descendants of a long-dead pirate, Captain Mephisto are holding the scientist for their own gain. Worst of all, one of the heirs possesses a Transformation Machine with the impossible ability of changing him into the molecular duplicate of his ancestor, Mephisto.

Cast
Richard Bailey as Lance Reardon, a private detective
Linda Stirling as Claire Forrest, daughter of Professor Forrest
Roy Barcroft as Higgins/ Captain Mephisto 
Kenne Duncan as Sidney Brand
Forrest Taylor as Professor William Forrest, inventor of the Radiatomic Power Transmitter
Forbes Murray as Professor Harry Hargraves
Jack Ingram as Edward Armstrong
Harry Strang as Frederick "Fred" Braley
Ed Cassidy as Paul Melton

Production
Manhunt of Mystery Island was budgeted at $167,912 although the final negative cost was $182,388 (a $14,476, or 8.6%, overspend).

It was filmed between 16 October and 18 November 1944 under the working titles Mystery Island and Manhunt.  The serial's production number was 1496.

Release

Theatrical
Manhunt of Mystery Island'''s official release date is 17 March 1945, although this is actually the date the seventh chapter was made available to film exchanges.

The serial was re-released on 2 January 1956 between the similar re-releases of Dick Tracy's G-Men and Adventures of Frank and Jesse James.  The last original Republic serial release was King of the Carnival in 1955.

TelevisionManhunt of Mystery Island was one of twenty-six Republic serials re-released as a "Century 66" film on television in 1966.  The title of the film was changed to Captain Mephisto and the Transformation Machine''.  This version was cut down to 100 minutes in length.

Chapter titles
 Secret Weapon (24min 38s)
 Satan's Web (14min 27s)
 The Murder Machine (14min 26s)
 The Lethal Chamber (14min 27s)
 Mephisto's Mantrap (14min 26s)
 Ocean Tomb (14min 27s)
 The Death Trap (14min 27s)
 Bombs Away (14min 26s)
 The Fatal Flood (13min 20s)
 The Sable Shroud (13min 20s) - a re-cap chapter
 Satan's Shadow (13min 20s)
 Cauldron of Cremation (13min 20s)
 Bridge to Eternity (13min 20s)
 Power Dive to Doom (13min 20s)
 Fatal Transformation (13min 20s)
Source:

See also
 List of film serials
 List of film serials by studio

References

External links
 
 
 Manhunt of Mystery Island: A review from an Objectivist perspective by David P. Hayes
 Manhunt of Mystery Island at Sci-fi Movies

1945 films
American black-and-white films
1940s English-language films
1940s science fiction adventure films
Republic Pictures film serials
Films directed by Spencer Gordon Bennet
American science fiction adventure films
Films with screenplays by Joseph F. Poland
1940s American films